Isaac Spitz (1764 – 6 May 1842) was av beit din in Bunzlau, Bohemia. He wrote Matʼame Yitzḥak, a collection of songs, melodies, and sayings, which was published posthumously in Prague in 1843.

Biography
Isaac Spitz was born in Kolin, Kingdom of Bohemia, the son of a Torah scribe. He left for Prague in 1779 to study at the yeshiva of Yechezkel Landau, during which time he studied Hebrew language and literature as well as Mendelssohn's and Lessing's writings. He moved to Fürth in 1785 to the yeshiva of Meshullam Solomon Kohn, and was ordained by the local beit din in 1792. He returned to Kolin as a pupil of Eleazar Kalir and teacher in the house of Adam Friedländer, and married Rebekka Fleckeles, daughter of Elazar Fleckeles.

He was the father of the grammarian Yom-Tov Spitz, and maternal grandfather of the poet Moritz Hartmann.

References
 

1764 births
1842 deaths
Bohemian Jews
Hebrew-language poets
People from Mladá Boleslav
People from Kolín